Melvin Frank (13 August 1913 – 13 October 1988) was an American screenwriter, film producer and film director. He is known for his partnership with Norman Panama and their work on films such as Mr. Blandings Builds His Dream House (1948), White Christmas (1954), and The Court Jester (1956). He also directed films such as Buona Sera, Mrs. Campbell and A Touch of Class (1973).

Life and career
Born to a Jewish family, Frank met his future collaborator Norman Panama in 1933 when they were both at the University of Chicago. After graduating, they formed a partnership in 1935 which endured for four decades; first writing for Milton Berle before becoming writers for Bob Hope's radio show. In 1941, they sold their first script to Paramount Pictures, My Favorite Blonde (1942), which starred Hope.

They worked for Paramount for five years where, among others, they wrote Road to Utopia (1946), starring Hope and Bing Crosby, for which they received an Academy Award nomination for Best Original Screenplay. They moved to Columbia Pictures making It Had to Be You (1947) and The Return of October (1948) and also wrote Mr. Blandings Builds His Dream House (1948) for RKO.

In 1950, they signed a writing, producing and directing deal with Metro-Goldwyn-Mayer and made films together as co-writers, co-directors and co-producers. They started with The Reformer and the Redhead (1950) and also made Knock on Wood (1954) and The Court Jester (1956), both with Danny Kaye, with the former earning them another Academy Award nomination. They also co-wrote White Christmas (1954) with Norman Krasna. They wrote a Broadway play together in 1956, later adapted into Li'l Abner (1959), directed by Frank. They received another Academy Award nomination for The Facts of Life (1960) and also worked on  The Road to Hong Kong (1962).

Frank went on to a successful solo career as a film director, most notably directing the acclaimed romantic comedy A Touch of Class (1973), starring George Segal and Glenda Jackson. The film was nominated for the Academy Award for Best Picture and Best Writing, Story and Screenplay Based on Factual Material or Material Not Previously Published or Produced (with Jack Rose) and Jackson won the Academy Award for Best Actress for her role. Subsequent films directed by Frank include The Duchess and the Dirtwater Fox (1976) and Lost and Found (1979).

Over the course of his career, Frank was nominated for five Academy Awards. In 1984, he received the Laurel Award for Screenwriting Achievement from the Writers Guild of America.

Death
Frank had open heart surgery on October 12, 1988 and died the following day.

Personal life
Frank's first wife was Anne Ray, younger sister of actress Jigee Viertel. At the time of his death he was still married to his second wife, Juliet. He had three children, Pulitzer Prize-winning writer Elizabeth Frank and sons Andrew and James.

Selected filmography
My Favorite Blonde (with Norman Panama) (1942) (story only)
Road to Utopia (with Norman Panama) (1946)
Monsieur Beaucaire (with Norman Panama) (1946)
It Had to Be You (with Norman Panama) (1947) 
The Return of October (with Norman Panama) (1948)
Mr. Blandings Builds His Dream House (with Norman Panama) (1948)
The Reformer and the Redhead (with Norman Panama) (1950) (also co-director)
Strictly Dishonorable (with Norman Panama) (1951) (also co-director)
Callaway Went Thataway (with Norman Panama) (1951) (also co-director)
Above and Beyond (with Norman Panama) (1952) (also co-director)
White Christmas (with Norman Panama and Norman Krasna) (1954)
Knock on Wood (with Norman Panama) (1954) (also co-director)
The Court Jester (with Norman Panama) (1956) (also co-director)
That Certain Feeling (with Norman Panama) (1956) (also co-director)
Li'l Abner (with Norman Panama) (1959) (also director)
The Trap (with Norman Panama) (1959)
The Jayhawkers! (with Norman Panama) (1959) (also director)
The Facts of Life (with Norman Panama) (1960) (also director)
The Road to Hong Kong (with Norman Panama) (1962)
Strange Bedfellows (with Norman Panama and Michael Pertwee) (1965) (also director)
Not with My Wife, You Don't! (with Norman Panama, Peter Barnes and Larry Gelbart) (1966)
A Funny Thing Happened on the Way to the Forum (with Michael Pertwee) (1966)
Buona Sera, Mrs. Campbell (with Denis Norden and Sheldon Keller) (1968) (also director)
A Touch of Class (with Jack Rose) (1973) (also director and producer)
The Prisoner of Second Avenue (1975) (director)
The Duchess and the Dirtwater Fox (with Barry Sandler and Jack Rose) (1976) (also director)
Lost and Found (with Jack Rose) (1979) (also director)
Walk Like a Man (1987) (director only)

References

External links

1913 births
1988 deaths
University of Chicago alumni
American male screenwriters
Jewish American screenwriters
20th-century American male writers
Filmmaking duos
American film directors
20th-century American screenwriters
20th-century American Jews